Peter Man Pei Tak is a former Hong Kong professional football player and current amateur player for Hong Kong First Division club Eastern District.

Club career

2008–09
On 16 November 2008, Man Pei Tak played as captain and scored a wonder goal to help South China defeat arch rival Kitchee 3:1 in a league match. It was his first goal since he joined the Caroliners.

2010–11
Under coach Kim Pan-Gon, Man Pei Tak's playing opportunities were limited. But when Kim suddenly left South China near the end of 2010, replacement coach Chan Ho Yin allowed him more opportunities, especially at the right back position.

In the 2011 AFC Cup, during the away game to Persipura Jayapura, Man Pei Tak handled the ball and gave away a penalty which was converted by Boaz Solossa. Persipura eventually won the game 4:2 and knocked South China out of the tournament.

Managerial career
On 10 July 2019, Man was named head coach of Pegasus. Less than a year into his reign, he was demoted back to director and assistant coach following Kwok Kar Lok's arrival as head coach.

International
In the 2010 East Asian Football Championship semi final tournament, Man Pei Tak scored the opening goal against Guam and paved the way for a 12:0 win, allowing Hong Kong to qualify for the finals of the tournament in Japan.

In the 2011 AFC Asian Cup qualifying match away to Bahrain, Man Pei Tak was named captain. But Hong Kong lost the game 0:4.

Personal life
In June 2018, Man and his wife Alice welcomed their first child, a son.

Endorsements
Man Pei Tak is a spokesman for Jockey International, along with Hong Kong Pegasus former player Chan Siu Ki.

Career statistics
As of 10 October 2012

International career
As of 6 February 2013

References

External links
 Man Pei Tak at HKFA
 
 

1982 births
Living people
Hong Kong footballers
Hong Kong international footballers
Association football defenders
South China AA players
Hong Kong Rangers FC players
TSW Pegasus FC players
Hong Kong Premier League players
Eastern Sports Club footballers
Kitchee SC players
Footballers at the 2002 Asian Games
Asian Games competitors for Hong Kong
TSW Pegasus FC managers
Hong Kong football managers
Hong Kong League XI representative players